"You Won't See Me Cry" is a song by American pop music group Wilson Phillips from their second studio album, Shadows and Light (1992). The song was released on April 28, 1992, by SBK Records. It was released as the lead single from the album, reaching  1 in Canada and Finland, No. 18 in the United Kingdom, and No. 20 on the US Billboard Hot 100. It was the group's last top-50 hit in most countries.

Critical reception
Greg Sandow from Entertainment Weekly called the song "tough/sweet blend of sadness and underlying strength." David Hiltbrand of People disagreed, describing it as a "wispy and anemic ballad."

Chart performance
"You Won't See Me Cry" debuted and peaked at No. 18 on the UK Singles Chart on May 23, 1992. During its first week on US radio, it became the most added song on the American Top 40, with 141 adds in its first seven days, debuting at No. 33 on the airplay chart. The song soon peaked at No. 20 on the Billboard Hot 100, and it also reached No. 4 on the Billboard Adult Contemporary chart.

In Canada, on July 4, 1992, "You Won't See Me Cry" reached number one on the RPM Top Singles chart after spending nine weeks in the top 100, staying at that position for one week. The song also topped the Finnish Singles Chart on the two-week chart period of May 25 and June 1, 1992. Elsewhere, the single reached the top 50 in Australia, Germany, Ireland and Switzerland.

Charts

Weekly charts

Year-end charts

Release history

References

1992 singles
Number-one singles in Finland
RPM Top Singles number-one singles
SBK Records singles
Song recordings produced by Glen Ballard
Songs written by Glen Ballard
Wilson Phillips songs